Yasuj (also romanized as Yāsūj, Yasooj, and Yesūj; Luri:  Jasuc or  Jasyç) is a city and capital of Kohgiluyeh and Boyer-Ahmad Province, Iran. At the 2006 census, its population was 96,786, in 20,297 families.

Yasuj is an industrial city in the Zagros Mountains of southwestern Iran. The term Yasuj is also used to refer to the entire region.

Yasuj has a sugar processing plant.

History
The area of Yasuj has been settled since as early as the Bronze Age. Findings include the Martyrs Hills (dating from 3rd millennium BC), the Khosravi Hill from the Achaemenian period, the ancient site of Gerd, the Pataveh bridge, and the Pay-e Chol cemetery. Yasuj is the place where Alexander III of Macedon and his Macedonian forces stormed the Persian Gates (Darvazeh-ye Fars), and found a way into the Persian heartland (331 BC).

The Yasuj Museum, which opened in 2002, displays coins, statues, pottery, and bronze vessels recovered from surrounding archaeological sites.

Climate
Yasuj has the typical continental-influenced Mediterranean climate (Köppen Csa) of western Iran, though because of its location in the direct line of rain-bearing winds from the Persian Gulf it is the wettest Iranian city south of the Elburz Mountains with an annual rainfall nine times that of Isfahan and twice that of Kermanshah. The heavy precipitation allows the existence of small glaciers on the highest Zagros peaks – in contrast the Kuhrud Mountains to the east have no glaciers despite being of the same height due to aridity. The long dry season sees only on average  of rainfall between June and September, with the wet season extending into October, unlike many other Mediterranean climates.

Demographics 

According to the general population and housing census in 2016, the population of this city was 134,532 people (in 54,850 households).

The population of Yasuj city in 2016, including some suburban villages, is just over 250,000 people.

Economy
The economy of Yasuj is based on the following local activities:

 baskets
 carpets/rugs
 mosaic tiles
 bricks
 livestock feed

By 2014 a new refinery will be constructed by the private sector, at a cost of $2.2 billion. It will produce petrol, gasoil, kerosene, furnace oil, liquefied gas, asphalt, and sulfur.

Education
 Yasouj University 

 Yasuj University of Medical Sciences
 Yasuj Azad University

See also 

 Dr seyed Ali Malekhosainei surgeon, Doctor 
 Seyyed Nasir Hosseini (Imam of Friday Prayer, of Yasuj)

References

External links
Official website 
Photo of Yasuj city
Videos of Yasuj powerplant construction
"Persian Gates" from Livius.org

Populated places in Boyer-Ahmad County
Cities in Kohgiluyeh and Boyer-Ahmad Province
Iranian provincial capitals